The South Korean navy includes the Republic of Korea Navy Headquarters, Republic of Korea Fleet, Republic of Korea Marine Corps, Naval Education and Training Command, Naval Logistics Command, and Naval Academy. The Chief of Naval Operations (CNO) is the highest-ranking officer of the ROK Navy.

The ROK Navy operates several naval bases in South Korea: Jinhae, Busan, Donghae, Pyeongtaek, Mokpo, Incheon, Pohang, Jeju Island, Baengnyeong Island. Jinhae has been the major port for the ROK Navy since the establishment of the Korean Coast Guard by hosting vital naval facilities including the Naval Shipyard; the Jinhae Naval Base Command is responsible for protecting the area. The Busan Naval Base has become another major naval base for the ROK Fleet since its Command Headquarters moved from Jinhae in 2007. Donghae, Pyeongtaek, and Mokpo hosts the command headquarters of the First, Second and the Third Fleet respectively. Incheon hosts the Incheon Naval Sector Defense Command responsible for protecting littoral waters close to Seoul, the nation's capital. 

Naval air stations are in Pohang (K-3), Mokpo (K-15), and Jinhae (K-10).

Organization

Republic of Korea Navy Headquarters

Jinhae Naval Base Command
Naval Forces Analysis, Test and Evaluation Group
Information Systems Management Group
Naval Military Police Group
Naval Military Court
Naval Archives and History Management Group
Force Support System Project Group
Service and Support Battalion, Seoul
Maritime Medical Center
Pohang Naval Hospital

Republic of Korea Fleet
Republic of Korea Marine Corps

Naval Education and Training Command
Naval Reserve Officer Training Corps
Naval Basic Military Training Group

Naval Logistics Command 
Naval Shipyard
Naval Ordnance Ammunition Center
Naval Supply Center
Naval Information and Communication Squadron
Naval Technology Research Institute

Naval Academy
Officer Candidate School 
Naval Academy Museum

Republic of Korea Navy Headquarters

Chief of Naval Operations

Office of Inspector General
Office of Judge Advocate General
Office of Chief of Chaplains
Office of ACNO, Marine Corps Affairs
Office of Public Affairs, Troop Information and Education

Vice Chief of Naval Operations
Office of Flag Secretary to CNO
Deputy CNO Planning and Management (N5)
Deputy CNO Manpower and Personnel (N1)
Deputy CNO Intelligence and Operations (N2/3)
Deputy CNO Logistics (N4)
Office of C4I Planning (N6)

Republic of Korea Fleet

Commander Republic of Korea Fleet 
First Fleet (HQ: Donghae)

 Maritime Battle Group One
 Battle Squadron 11
Battle Squadron 12
Battle Squadron 13
Logistics Squadron 1
Base Squadron 1
Training Squadron 1
Early Warning Squadron 108
Early Warning Squadron 118

Second Fleet (HQ: Pyeongtaek)

Maritime Battle Group Two
Battle Squadron 21
Battle Squadron 22
Battle Squadron 23
Logistics Squadron 2
Base Squadron 2
Training Squadron 2
Early Warning Squadron 208
Incheon Naval Sector Defense Command
Patrol Craft Squadron 27

Third Fleet (HQ: Mokpo)

Maritime Battle Group Three
Battle Squadron 31
Battle Squadron 32
Logistics Squadron 3
Base Squadron 3
Training Squadron 3
Busan Harbor Defense Squadron
Jeju Naval Base Squadron

Submarine Force Command

Submarine Squadron 91
Submarine Squadron 92 
Submarine Squadron 93  
Submarine Squadron 95
Submarine Squadron 96
Submarine Squadron 97
Submarine Education and Training Squadron 909
Submarine Repair Yard

Component Flotilla Five

Mine Squadron 52
Amphibious Squadron 53
Naval Mobile Construction Squadron 59

Air Wing Six

Patrol Air Group 61
Maritime Helicopter Group 62
Naval Air Group 63
Logistics Group 65
Base Group 66
Education and Training Group 609

Maritime Task Flotilla Seven
Maritime Task Squadron 71
Maritime Task Squadron 72
Maritime Mobile Logistics Squadron 73

Naval Battle Training Group Eight
Maritime Training Squadron 81
Shore Training Squadron 82

Naval Special Warfare Flotilla

Special Warfare Squadron (UDT/SEAL/EOD)
Sea Salvage & Rescue Unit (SSU)

Naval Intelligence Group

Republic of Korea Marine Corps

Headquarters Republic of Korea Marine Corps 

Yeonpyeong Unit
Education and Training Group
Logistics Support Group
1st Marine Division
2nd Marine Division
6th Marine Brigade
9th Marine Brigade

References 

Navy
Republic of Korea Navy